Women's 1500m races for class T54 wheelchair athletes at the 2004 Summer Paralympics were held in the Athens Olympic Stadium on 23 and 24 September. The event consisted of 2 heats and a final, and was won by Chantal Petitclerc, representing .

1st round

Heat 1
23 Sept. 2004, 09:15

Heat 2
23 Sept. 2004, 09:25

Final round

24 Sept. 2004, 20:50

References

W
2004 in women's athletics